Josian Lebon (born 6 August 1973) is a Mauritian boxer. He competed in the men's featherweight event at the 1996 Summer Olympics.

References

External links
 

1973 births
Living people
Mauritian male boxers
Olympic boxers of Mauritius
Boxers at the 1996 Summer Olympics
Place of birth missing (living people)
Featherweight boxers